Abdulaziz bin Salman Al Saud ( ʿAbd al ʿAzīz bin Salman Al Suʿūd; born 1960) is a Saudi royal and politician who has served as the Saudi Arabian minister of energy since September 2019. He is the first royal to serve as energy minister. He was the assistant oil minister of Saudi Arabia between 2005 and 2017. In 2017, he was made state minister for energy affairs.

Early life and education
Prince Abdulaziz was born in 1960. He is the fourth son of King Salman bin Abdulaziz. His mother is Sultana bint Turki Al Sudairi, who died at age 71 in July 2011. She was the daughter of Prince Salman's uncle, Turki bin Ahmed Al Sudairi, who was formerly the governor of Asir Province. Abdulaziz bin Salman is the full brother of Fahd bin Salman, Ahmed bin Salman, Sultan bin Salman, Faisal bin Salman and Hassa bint Salman.

Abdulaziz bin Salman received a science degree in industrial administration from King Fahd University of Petroleum and Minerals. He also holds an MBA in industrial administration from the same university in 1985.

Career
Abdulaziz bin Salman began his career as a lecturer at King Fahd University of Petroleum and Minerals, followed by a period as an acting director of the research institute there, dealing with energy studies. Later, he served as the manager of the economic and industrial research division at the same institute.

In 1987, he became an advisor at the oil ministry. During his tenure, he is said to have had tense relations with the oil minister, Hisham Nazer. Prince Abdulaziz was promoted to deputy oil minister in June 1995. He was also appointed undersecretary for petroleum affairs, a body founded in June 1996. In addition, he was the head of the energy rationalization committee.

His term as deputy oil minister lasted until 2005 when he was appointed assistant oil minister. His term as assistant oil minister ended on 22 April 2017 when he was made state minister for energy affairs. During this role, he achieved a major breakthrough in talks with OPEC member Kuwait to resume production in the neutral zone between the two countries, after a four-year halt.

On 8 September 2019 he was named as the minister of energy.

Influence
As assistant oil minister, Prince Abdulaziz was regarded as a significant figure in Saudi politics since he dealt directly with the Kingdom's major source of income, petroleum. He is said to be popular and has supporters who have benefited from their support of him and his father, King Salman. Prince Abdulaziz was considered to be one of the future key players in Saudi Arabia when the grandsons of King Abdulaziz begin to rule the country. He was also considered to be a potential successor to the former oil minister, Ali Naimi.

Other roles
Prince Abdulaziz is a member of the board of governors of the following organizations: Oxford Institute for Energy Studies, Oxford Energy Policy Club and the Institute of Petroleum. He is honorary president of the Saudi Economic Association. He is also the supervisor-general of the Prince Fahd bin Salman Charity Association for Renal Failure Patients Care.

Personal life
Abdulaziz bin Salman is married to Sara bint Khalid bin Musaid bin Abdulaziz (born 1966). They have three children: Prince Salman, Prince Khalid and Princess Sultana.

Ancestry

References

External links

 

20th-century Saudi Arabian politicians
21st-century Saudi Arabian politicians
1960 births
Living people
Abdulaziz
Abdulaziz
Energy ministers of Saudi Arabia
Petroleum and mineral resources ministers of Saudi Arabia
King Fahd University of Petroleum and Minerals alumni
Academic staff of King Fahd University of Petroleum and Minerals
Date of birth missing (living people)
Place of birth missing (living people)